Ellipsis is the seventh studio album by Scottish alternative rock band Biffy Clyro. It was produced by Rich Costey and released on 8 July 2016. Ellipsis entered the UK charts at number one, making it Biffy Clyro's second number one album (after 2013's Opposites).

Background 
Confirmation that the band was working on a new record came in early 2014, with frontman Simon Neil telling Radio X in an interview that they had written "about 14 songs so far", stating that the album was projected for possible release by the end of 2015. He also commented saying that the band was due to take a break from public involvement to bring themselves away from the spotlight following touring in support of their 2013 album, Opposites.

The band took 2015 as a "year off" from public appearances, as they did not want fans to tire of seeing them, although they did play a one off show as the headline act in Edinburgh's Hogmanay Concert in the Gardens, where they debuted a new song "On a Bang". The band recorded the majority of the album in Burbank, California following drummer Ben Johnston's claims that they would visit somewhere "exotic" to record it as a change of pace from their home country of Scotland. The band took a similar approach in 2012 while working on the previous record, travelling to West Los Angeles, California to record the majority of the album.

In January 2016, the band discussed the album with NME, calling it the "best record we've made", and revealing John Waters and hip-hop artist A$AP Rocky as influences of the sound of the new music.

In the days leading up to 21 March 2016, the band's official YouTube channel released snippets from the album's first single, "Wolves of Winter", announcing the date of the single's release. On 21 March, the videos were removed, and replaced by a 1:30 long preview of the song announcing the name and release date of the album. The song was first played in full on 21 March during Zane Lowe's Hottest Record on Beats 1, and again later during Annie Mac's World's Hottest Record on Radio 1. Lead singer Simon Neil appeared on both broadcasts to speak about the album and reveal some extra details about the background of the single.

Artwork and releases
A limited edition Ellipsis box set has been made available to pre-order exclusively on the band's official store site. The full set includes two 180g heavyweight vinyl records, a 7" single ("Wolves of Winter"), a hard-cover book featuring photos and lyrics, hand-written lyrics from Simon Neil, and several prints signed by band members. It also includes a full digital copy of the album on release, and a downloadable MP3 of the album's first single.

The album's finalised artwork was released on 8 April 2016 via the band's official website and Instagram pages.

The standard album features 11 tracks, with a 13-track "Deluxe" edition released alongside the original. The deluxe edition of the album also contains an additional video when purchased on iTunes.

Accolades

Track listing
Songs and lyrics by Simon Neil, music by Simon Neil except where noted.

Personnel 
Biffy Clyro
Simon Neil – lead vocals, guitars
James Johnston – bass guitar, backing vocals
Ben Johnston – drums, backing vocals, percussion

Production
 Rich Costey – production, additional editing
 Biffy Clyro – co-production
 James Rushent – programming and additional production on "Wolves of Winter"
 John Feldmann – additional production and recording on "Animal Style"
 Martin Cooke – engineering
 Nicolas Fournier – engineering
 Mario Borgatta – engineering assistance
 Zak Corvine – additional engineering on "Animal Style"
 Matt Pauling – additional engineering on "Animal Style"
 Allie Snow – engineering assistance on "Animal Style"
 Zach Tuch – engineering assistance on "Animal Style"
Vlado Meller – mastering
 Jeremy Lubsey – mastering assistance
 Ian Sefchick – vinyl mastering

Charts

Weekly charts

Year-end charts

Certifications

References

External links 

2016 albums
Biffy Clyro albums